Science Fiction is an album by the American jazz saxophonist and composer Ornette Coleman, recorded in 1971 and released on the Columbia label. 

In 2000, the album was re-released with Broken Shadows (1971) and several unreleased tracks as a 2-CD set titled The Complete Science Fiction Sessions.

Recording
The album features Coleman's early 70s quartet, consisting of Charlie Haden (double bass), Ed Blackwell (drums), and Dewey Redman (tenor saxophone). It also features performances by former Coleman sidemen Billy Higgins (drums), Don Cherry (trumpet), and Bobby Bradford (trumpet), as well as vocals by Indian singer Asha Puthli.

Reception
The Allmusic review by Steve Huey awarded the album 5 stars and stated "Science Fiction was his creative rebirth, a stunningly inventive and appropriately alien-sounding blast of manic energy... Science Fiction is a meeting ground between Coleman's past and future; it combines the fire and edge of his Atlantic years with strong hints of the electrified, globally conscious experiments that were soon to come. And, it's overflowing with brilliance". The Rolling Stone Jazz Record Guide called it "fascinating" and "multifaceted."

Track listing
All compositions by Ornette Coleman
 "What Reason Could I Give?" - 3:06 
 "Civilization Day" - 6:04 
 "Street Woman" - 4:50 
 "Science Fiction" - 5:03 
 "Rock the Clock" - 3:16 
 "All My Life" - 3:56 
 "Law Years" - 5:22 
 "The Jungle Is a Skyscraper" - 5:26 
Recorded at Columbia Studio E, NYC on September 9 (tracks 2, 3, 7 & 8), September 10 (track 4) and October 13 (tracks 1, 5 & 6), 1971

Personnel
Ornette Coleman - alto saxophone, trumpet, violin
Don Cherry - pocket trumpet (tracks 2-4)
Bobby Bradford (tracks 4, 7 & 8), Carmine Fornarotto (tracks 1 & 6), Gerard Schwarz (tracks 1 & 6) - trumpet
Dewey Redman - tenor saxophone, musette (tracks 1 & 4-8)
Charlie Haden - bass
Billy Higgins (tracks 1-4 & 6), Ed Blackwell (tracks 1 & 4-8) - drums
David Henderson - recitation (track 4)
Asha Puthli - vocals (tracks 1 & 6)

References

1972 albums
Ornette Coleman albums
Columbia Records albums
Free jazz albums